David Halaifonua (born July 5, 1987) is a Tongan national rugby union player who currently plays for London Scottish in the RFU Championship and for the Tonga national team.

Halaifonua first played club rugby for Warringah, a rugby union club located in New South Wales, Australia, that compete in their competitions, the Shute Shield and the Tooheys New Cup. He then moved to France as he signed a contract for US Bergerac, who compete in Federale 1, the third level of domestic competition in France.

During the 2013–14 season, Halaifonua joined fellow Tongans Hale T-Pole and Paula Kaho in Sri Lanka. He played for the Sri Lanka champions Kandy SC.

On 4 December 2014, Halaifonua officially signed for English side Gloucester Rugby who compete in the Aviva Premiership from the 2014–15 season.

Halaifonua made his international debut for Tonga in the 2009 IRB Pacific Nations Cup losing 22-36 to Fiji.

On 26 April 2018, David left Gloucester, having played 44 times, to sign for newly-promoted side Coventry in the RFU Championship from the 2018-19 season.

He joined London Scottish ahead of the 2020–21 season.

References

External links
 
US Bergerac Profile 
Gloucester Rugby Profile

1987 births
Living people
Tongan rugby union players
People from Vavaʻu
Tonga international rugby union players
Gloucester Rugby players
Coventry R.F.C. players
Ampthill RUFC players
London Scottish F.C. players
Rugby union fullbacks